Minuscule 25 (in the Gregory-Aland numbering), A139 (Soden). It is a Greek minuscule manuscript of the New Testament, written on vellum, on parchment leaves. Palaeographically it has been assigned to the 11th-century. It has marginalia (incomplete) and was adapted for liturgical use.

Description 

The codex contains a text of the four Gospels on 292 thick parchment leaves, with considerable lacunae. The text is written in one column per page, biblical text in 13 lines per page, text of commentary in 42 lines per page, in brown ink. The capital letters are in red ink.

There is no another division according to the Ammonian Sections with references to the Eusebian Canons.

Grandly written, but very imperfect.

Lacunae:
Matthew Mt 1:1-4:25; 23:1-25:42; 26:43-55; 28:10-20; Luke 20:19-22:46; John 12:40-13:1; 15:24-16:12; 18:16-28; 20:19-21:19-25.

It has errors by iota subscriptum.

Text 

The Greek text of the codex is a representative of the Byzantine text-type. Kurt Aland placed it in Category V. It was not examined by Claremont Profile Method.

History 

The manuscript is dated by the INTF to the 11th-century.

It was added to the list of the New Testament manuscripts by Johann Jakob Wettstein, who gave it the number 25. 
It was examined and described by Griesbach, Scholz, and Paulin Martin. C. R. Gregory saw the manuscript in 1885.

It is currently housed at the Bibliothèque nationale de France (Gr. 191) in Paris.

See also 

 List of New Testament minuscules
 Textual criticism

References 

Greek New Testament minuscules
11th-century biblical manuscripts
Bibliothèque nationale de France collections